USS Ulysses S. Grant (SSBN-631), a  fleet ballistic missile submarine, was the third ship of the United States Navy to be named for Ulysses S. Grant (1822–1885), American Civil War general and the 18th President of the United States (1869-1877).

Construction and commissioning

The contract to build Ulysses S. Grant was awarded to the Electric Boat Division of General Dynamics Corporation in Groton, Connecticut, on 20 July 1961 and her keel was laid down there on 18 August 1962.  She was launched on 2 November 1963, sponsored by President Grant's great-granddaughter Edith (Grant) Griffiths, wife of Colonel David W. Griffiths (retired), and commissioned on 17 July 1964 with Captain J. L. From, Jr., in command of the Blue Crew.  In September, Commander C.A.K. McDonald took command of the Gold Crew.

Service history

Following shakedown, the Ulysses S. Grant got underway from Groton in early December 1964, bound for the Pacific Ocean. Transiting the Panama Canal on 31 December 1964, she arrived at Pearl Harbor in January 1965. She was deployed to Guam, in the Mariana Islands, and conducted 18 deterrent patrols operating from there equipped with Polaris ballistic missiles before returning to the United States in 1969. After an overhaul and conversion to carry Poseidon ballistic missiles at Puget Sound Naval Shipyard at Bremerton, Washington, Ulysses S. Grant was deployed to Holy Loch in  Scotland in 1970, and operated in the European area until September 1977.

In the mid-1980s, Ulysses S. Grant underwent a refueling overhaul at Portsmouth Naval Shipyard, in Kittery, Maine.  After the overhaul period, the Blue Crew completed what was called "The best DASO (Demonstration and Shakedown Operation) in 10 years," which concluded with the firing of a test missile on 31 July 1987.  Ulysses S. Grant then returned to Naval Submarine Base New London in Connecticut, where the Gold Crew, under the command of Commander Michael P. McBride, took Ulysses S. Grant through a non-firing second-half DASO.  During that period, the Gold Crew enjoyed a luxury for a "boomer" crew, a swim call in the Caribbean.

On 7 April 1987, two crewmen of Ulysses S. Grant were swept off the submarine's deck during heavy seas 3 miles off Portsmouth, New Hampshire. One man, Lt. David Jimenez of Groton, Connecticut, was rescued but was pronounced dead soon afterwards. The other crewman remains presumed "lost at sea".

In 1989, after the Blue Crew turned Ulysses S. Grant over to the Gold Crew while she was moored alongside the submarine tender , the Gold Crew took the submarine to Holy Loch, and Ulysses S. Grant operated on deterrent patrols out of Holy Loch for the remainder of her career.

Decommissioning and disposal

Ulysses S. Grant was decommissioned on 12 June 1992 and stricken from the Naval Vessel Register on the same day. Her scrapping via the Nuclear-Powered Ship and Submarine Recycling Program at Bremerton was completed on 23 October 1993.

Commemoration
Ulysses S. Grants ship's bell is stored at the submarine base at Bremerton, where it has been used in retirement ceremonies.

Notes

References 

 

Ships built in Groton, Connecticut
James Madison-class submarines
Cold War submarines of the United States
Nuclear submarines of the United States Navy
1963 ships